Lawrence Naesen (born 28 August 1992 in Ostend) is a Belgian cyclist, who currently rides for UCI WorldTeam . He is the brother of racing cyclist Oliver Naesen, who is also a member of the  team.

In September 2017 it was announced that Naesen would join  on a two-year contract from 2018. Upon the expiration of his contract, he joined .

Major results

2016
 5th Memorial Philippe Van Coningsloo
 6th Circuit de Wallonie
2017
 3rd Bruges Cycling Classic
 5th Heistse Pijl
 5th Dwars door de Vlaamse Ardennen
2019
 6th Kampioenschap van Vlaanderen
 7th Bredene Koksijde Classic
 8th Eschborn–Frankfurt
 9th Omloop van het Houtland
 10th Nokere Koerse
 10th Famenne Ardenne Classic
2020
 7th Brussels Cycling Classic
2021
 8th Grand Prix d'Isbergues
 8th Paris–Chauny
2022
 10th Trofeo Alcúdia – Port d'Alcúdia

Grand Tour general classification results timeline

References

External links

1992 births
Living people
Belgian male cyclists
Sportspeople from Ostend
Cyclists from West Flanders
21st-century Belgian people